Gold Collection is a 1994 double-disc compilation album by American singer Frank Sinatra.

Track listing

Disc one
"Stardust"
"Whispering"
"Fools Rush In (Where Angels Fear to Tread)"
"Polka Dots and Moonbeams"
"I'll Be Seeing You"
"East of the Sun (and West of the Moon)"
"Daybreak"
"This Love of Mine"
"I'll Never Smile Again"
"Kisses and Tears"
"Tea for Two"
"Getting to Know You"
"Some Enchanted Evening"
"The Moon Was Yellow (And the Night Is Young)"
"Imagination"
"My Blue Heaven"
"Begin the Beguine"
"Blue Skies"
"I've Got My Love to Keep Me Warm"
"Somebody Loves Me"

Disc two
"Come Fly with Me"
"I Get a Kick Out of You"
"I've Got You Under My Skin"
"Where or When"
"Moonlight in Vermont"
"On the Road to Mandalay"
"When Your Lover Has Gone"
"April in Paris"
"All the Way"
"Monique"
"Bewitched, Bothered and Bewildered"
"The Lady Is a Tramp"
"You Make Me Feel So Young"
"Night and Day"
"Dancing in the Dark"
"My Funny Valentine"
"Embraceable You"
"At Long Last Love"
"I Could Have Danced All Night"
"My Way"

1994 compilation albums
Frank Sinatra compilation albums